Hulda is a feminine given name derived from חולדה Chuldah or Huldah, a Hebrew word meaning weasel or mole. Huldah was a prophetess in the Old Testament Books of Kings and Chronicles. It can also derive from Norse mythology, where it is the name of a sorceress, meaning secrecy in Old Norse and sweet or lovable in Old Swedish.
In the United States, its use has declined since the mid-1920s.

Variants
Huldah
Chuldah

Notable people
Notable people with this name include:
Hulda Berger (1912–1951), American figure skater
Hulda Crooks (1896–1997), American mountaineer
Hulda Flood (1886–1968), Swedish politician
Hulda Garborg (1862–1934), Norwegian writer
Hulda Regina Graser (1870-1943), Canadian-born American customs house broker
Hulda Lundin (1847–1921), Swedish tailor and educator
Hulda Mellgren (1839–1918) Swedish industrialist
Hulda Regehr Clark (1928–2009), American naturopath
Hulda Shipanga (1926–2010), Namibian nurse
Hulda Stumpf (1867–1930), Kenyan Christian missionary

Notes

Feminine given names
English given names
Hebrew-language names
Hebrew feminine given names
Icelandic feminine given names
Jewish given names
Danish feminine given names
Norwegian feminine given names
Scandinavian feminine given names
Swedish feminine given names